Dark Blue is a 2002 American neo-noir crime thriller film directed by Ron Shelton and written by David Ayer, based on a story written for film by crime novelist James Ellroy and takes place during the days leading up to the Rodney King trial verdict. The film stars Kurt Russell, with Ving Rhames and Brendan Gleeson in supporting roles.

Plot
Los Angeles, 1992. The film opens in medias res to LAPD Sergeant Eldon Perry, who is pacing in a motel room with a shotgun and pistol.

Five days earlier, four people are killed and one wounded when two men, Darryl Orchard and Gary Sidwell, rob a convenience store in order to gain access to the office safe. Meanwhile, Perry defends his partner, Detective Bobby Keough, before an internal hearing concerning Keough's use of deadly force in a previous case; Keough is later exonerated. Perry and Keough later celebrate the former's impending promotion with their superior, Jack Van Meter, who is also Keough's uncle. Van Meter, a corrupt cop who often encourages his subordinates to fabricate evidence, visits Orchard and Sidwell's house later that night and takes the money stolen from the safe, admonishing them for behaving recklessly during the robbery.

Van Meter assigns Perry and Keough to investigate the robbery, providing a false alibi for Orchard and Sidwell and telling them to pin the crime on someone else. Meanwhile, Assistant Chief Arthur Holland finds Perry's testimony at Keough's hearing suspicious, doubting that Keough killed the suspect as he was charged. His assistant, Beth Williamson, pulls files on the two men and sees that a man she previously had anonymous casual sex with is Keough.

After obtaining a search warrant using underhanded techniques, a SWAT team raids the house of the ex-cons who are to be Perry's fall guys. One of the men escapes and goes into a back alley but is caught by Perry and Keough. Under Perry's orders, Keough reluctantly kills the innocent man and is left visibly shaken. When Perry arrives home later, he learns that his wife is leaving him. Meanwhile, Keough visits Williamson and admits to the killing, offering to testify against Perry on corruption. Seeing both Perry and the robbers as loose ends, Van Meter sets them up to kill each other just as the Los Angeles riots begin.

Believing that Perry was sent by Van Meter to kill Orchard and Sidwell, Keough and Williamson also drive to the robbers' address. While all three eventually meet up in the alleys, Keough is killed by Orchard and Sidwell. Williamson tearfully blames Perry for what happened. Perry calls in the incident, hesitating briefly before pursuing Orchard and Sidwell. As the riots unfold, Sidwell is dragged out of his car and beaten to death while Orchard is captured by Perry. Perry then heads to his promotion ceremony, where he confesses about the corruption, implicates Van Meter, and volunteers himself to be arrested.

Cast

 Kurt Russell as Sergeant Eldon Perry
 Scott Speedman as Detective Bobby Keough
 Michael Michele as Sergeant Beth Williamson
 Brendan Gleeson as Commander Jack Van Meter
 Ving Rhames as Assistant Chief Arthur Holland
 Master P as 'Maniac'
 Kurupt as Darryl Orchard
 Dash Mihok as Gary Sidwell
 Jonathan Banks as Deputy Chief Jimmy Barcomb
 Eloy Casados as SWAT Commander Rico
 Graham Beckel as Detective Peltz
 William Utay as Detective Sapin
 Lolita Davidovich as Sally Perry
 Chapman Way as Eldon Perry III
 Marin Hinkle as Assistant District Attorney Deena Schultz
 Khandi Alexander as Janelle Holland
 Dana Lee as Huan Henry Kim
 Eddie Mui as Lucky 7 Bartender
 Faleolo Alailima as Lucky 7 Bouncer

Reception

Critical response
On Rotten Tomatoes, Dark Blue has an approval score of 59% based on 133 reviews, with an average rating of 5.90/10. The consensus reads, "Kurt Russell gives a good performance. Too bad there's nothing here that you haven't seen before." On Metacritic, the film has a score of 57 out of 100 based on 37 reviews, indicating "mixed or average reviews".

William Arnold of The Seattle Post-Intelligencer gave the film a positive review. "Ron Shelton's Dark Blue is another harrowingly cynical dirty-cop movie in the recent tradition of Training Day and Narc. Yet it's so much more complex, engrossing and satisfying than those films that the comparison is not entirely fair...."

However, the film received a negative review from the L.A. Weekly, "Dark Blue is stuffed to the gills with blithely improbable coincidence and subsidiary story line... Shelton is a likable, generous director who's made two pretty good films (Blaze and Bull Durham), but it's not at all clear he has the chops to take on an action movie, let alone the intricacies of police politics — let alone the politics of race, about which he had more imaginative things to say in White Men Can't Jump."

References

External links
 
 
 

2002 films
2002 crime thriller films
American crime thriller films
American police detective films
Films directed by Ron Shelton
Films produced by James Jacks
Films set in the 1990s
Films set in 1992
Films set in Los Angeles
Films shot in Los Angeles
United Artists films
American neo-noir films
Fictional portrayals of the Los Angeles Police Department
Films with screenplays by David Ayer
Films with screenplays by James Ellroy
Films scored by Terence Blanchard
2000s police procedural films
2000s English-language films
2000s American films